Good News is a 1979 Italian satirical comedy film written and directed by Elio Petri and starring  Giancarlo Giannini. It is the last film of Petri.

Plot 
An anonymous official of a television company leads an ordinary life; going to work every day and coming home to his wife. However, his marriage is in crisis because he and his wife can no longer communicate with one another. One day, he is contacted by an old friend he hasn't seen for several years. His friend confides that he is being threatened by mysterious assassins. After a series of adventures, including an erotic interlude with his friend's wife, he receives an envelope from his friend with the words, "not to be opened" on a series of cards that repeat that same sentence over and over. At his friend's Jewish funeral, the protagonist's wife tells him that she is expecting his dead friend's child.

Cast 

Giancarlo Giannini as The Man
Ángela Molina as Fedora 
Paolo Bonacelli as  Gualtiero Milano
Aurore Clément as  Ada 
Ombretta Colli as  Tignetti
Ritza Brown as Benedetta
Franco Iavarone as Commissioner
Ninetto Davoli as Trade Unionist

See also
 List of Italian films of 1979

References

External links

1970s satirical films
Italian satirical films
Italian black comedy films
Films directed by Elio Petri
1970s black comedy films
Films scored by Ennio Morricone
1979 comedy films
1979 films
1970s Italian films
1970s Italian-language films